The 2005–06 La Liga season, the 75th since its establishment, started on 27 August 2005 and finished on 20 May 2006 due to all top-flight European leagues ending earlier than the previous season because of 2006 FIFA World Cup.

Teams 
Twenty teams competed in the league – the top seventeen teams from the previous season and the three teams promoted from the Segunda División. The promoted teams were Cádiz, Celta de Vigo and Alavés, returning to the top flight after an absence of twelve, one and two years respectively. They replaced Levante, Numancia (both teams relegated after a season's presence) and Albacete (ending their two-year top flight spell).

Team information

Clubs and locations 

(*) Promoted from Segunda División.

League table

Results

Overall 
 Most wins - Barcelona (25)
 Fewest wins - Málaga (5)
 Most draws - Zaragoza (16)
 Fewest draws - Celta de Vigo (4)
 Most losses - Málaga (24)
 Fewest losses - Barcelona (6)
 Most goals scored - Barcelona (80)
 Fewest goals scored - Betis (34)
 Most goals conceded - Málaga (68)
 Fewest goals conceded - Celta de Vigo and Valencia (33)

Awards

Pichichi Trophy 
The Pichichi Trophy is awarded to the player who scores the most goals in a season.

Zamora Trophy 
The Zamora Trophy is awarded to the goalkeeper with least goals to games ratio.

Fair Play award 

 Source: Guia As de La Liga 2006–07, p. 144 (sports magazine)

Pedro Zaballa award 
Cádiz supporters

Hat-tricks

See also 
 List of transfers of La Liga – 2005-06 season
 2005–06 Segunda División
 2005–06 Copa del Rey

References

External links 

 
La Liga seasons
1
Spain